Walter Ephraim Brown (1867 – after 1890) was an English footballer who played in the Football Alliance for Small Heath. Brown was born in the Handsworth district of Birmingham and played football for several local clubs before spending a couple of months with Small Heath. He played in three of the first four games of the 1891–92 Football Alliance season, once on the left wing and twice at inside left, scoring in each of the latter two, before returning to local football with Crosswell's Brewery.

References

1867 births
Year of death missing
Footballers from Birmingham, West Midlands
English footballers
Association football forwards
Birmingham City F.C. players
Crosswell's Brewery F.C. players
Football Alliance players
Date of birth missing
Place of death missing
Footballers from Handsworth, West Midlands